Kim Jong-pan(Korean:김종판; born  in Seoul) is a South Korean wheelchair curler.

He participated at the 2014 Winter Paralympics where South Korean team finished on ninth place. In 2017 World Wheelchair Curling Championship, he played as the part of South Korean team and finished sixth in the competition.

Wheelchair curling teams and events

References

External links 

Profile at the 2014 Winter Paralympics site (web archive)

Living people
1970 births
Curlers from Seoul
South Korean male curlers
South Korean wheelchair curlers
Paralympic wheelchair curlers of South Korea
Wheelchair curlers at the 2014 Winter Paralympics
21st-century South Korean people